Melilotus altissimus, known by the common names tall yellow sweetclover, tall melilot and golden melilot is a plant species of the genus Melilotus.

Pollinators
Melilotus altissimus is a preferred food-plant of Bombus lucorum, B. terrestris and B. lapidarius - all three are short-tongued bumblebees found in the UK.

References

Trifolieae